David Kranjec (born 17 August 1994) is a Slovenian-Australian competitive figure skater. He is the 2016 Slovenian national champion and qualified for the free skate at the 2016 European Championships.

He represented Australia until the end of the 2013–14 season, winning the 2013 national title and competing at three ISU Championships – once at the World Junior Championships and twice at the Four Continents Championships.

Personal life 
David Kranjec was born on 17 August 1994 in Celje, Slovenia, and resides in Brisbane, Australia.

Career 
Kranec placed fourth at the 2007 Slovenian Championships.

2009–10 to 2013–14 
In the 2009–10 season, Kranjec won the junior bronze medal at the Australian Championships. He debuted on the ISU Junior Grand Prix (JGP) series in September 2011, placing 12th in Brisbane, Australia, and then 18th in Innsbruck, Austria.

In 2012–13, Kranjec won the Australian senior national title. He was sent to the 2013 Four Continents Championships in Osaka, Japan, where he finished last (23rd). At the 2013 World Junior Championships in Milan, Italy, he placed 20th of 37 skaters in the short program. He qualified for the free skate and finished 24th overall.

In the 2013–14 season, Kranjec competed at two JGP events, placing 11th in Gdańsk, Poland and 10th in Ostrava, Czech Republic. He finished second to Brendan Kerry at the Australian Championships. Making his final international appearance for Australia, he placed 21st at the 2014 Four Continents Championships.

2015–16 season 
In the 2015–16 season, Kranjec began competing internationally for Slovenia. After placing 8th at the Merano Cup, he won the bronze medal at the Golden Bear of Zagreb and took the Slovenian national title. He was assigned to the 2016 European Championships in Bratislava, Slovakia, where he qualified for the free skate.

Programs

Competitive highlights 
CS: ISU Challenger Series; JGP: ISU Junior Grand Prix

For Slovenia

For Australia

References

External links 
 

1994 births
Australian male single skaters
Slovenian male single skaters
Slovenian expatriate sportspeople in Australia
Living people
Sportspeople from Celje
Slovenian emigrants to Australia
Sportspeople from Brisbane